Mar Shimun XIV Shlemon was the Catholicos-Patriarch of the Church of the East of the Shem'on line (based in Qodshanis) from 1700 until 1740.

See also
 Patriarch of the Church of the East
 List of patriarchs of the Church of the East
 List of patriarchs of the Assyrian Church of the East
 Assyrian Church of the East

References

Sources

External links 
 Mar Shimun Patriarchal Timeline
 Official site of the Assyrian Church of the East

18th-century bishops of the Church of the East
18th-century archbishops
Assyrians from the Ottoman Empire
Bishops in the Ottoman Empire
18th-century people from the Ottoman Empire
Patriarchs of the Church of the East